Warrnambool Airport  is located  northwest of Warrnambool, Victoria in Australia. Avalon Air Services operates training activities from the airport. HEMS 4 (Helicopter Emergency Medical Service), an AgustaWestland AW139, of Air Ambulance Victoria is based at the airport.

See also
 List of airports in Victoria

References

Airports in Victoria (Australia)
Warrnambool